Stissing Mountain is a  mountain in New York. It is located southwest Pine Plains in Dutchess County. In 1933, a  steel fire lookout tower was built on the mountain. The tower ceased fire lookout operations sometime between 1979 and 1982. The tower has since been restored and is open to the public. Located just to the west of the Taconic Mountain range, Stissing Mountain is not related to this mountain chain, nor is it geologically a mountain. Geologically speaking, it is what is called a “moraine”.

History
In late 1933, the Boston Corners CCC Camp built a  International Derrick E-4898 steel fire lookout tower on the mountain. The tower had been provided to the State by the United States Forest Service. The tower was first staffed in 1935, reporting 91 fires and 610 visitors. The tower ceased fire lookout operations sometime between 1979 and 1982. The tower was later restored by the Friends of Stissing Landmarks and is open to the public.

References

Mountains of Dutchess County, New York
Mountains of New York (state)